These are the official results of the Women's 20 km Walk at the 2000 Summer Olympics in Sydney, Australia. The race was held on Thursday 28 September 2000, starting at 10:45h.

Medalists

Abbreviations
All times shown are in hours:minutes:seconds

Records

No new world record was established in the competition. By winning the event, Wang Liping established the Olympic record, 1:29.05.

Final ranking

See also
 1997 Women's World Championships 10 km Walk (Athens)
 1998 Women's European Championships 10 km Walk (Budapest)
 1999 Women's World Championships 20 km Walk (Seville)
 2000 Race Walking Year Ranking
 2001 Women's World Championships 20 km Walk (Edmonton)
 2002 Women's European Championships 20 km Walk (Munich)
 2003 Women's World Championships 20 km Walk (Paris)

References

External links
 Official Report
 Results
 Official Report of the 2000 Sydney Summer Olympics

W
Racewalking at the Olympics
2000 in women's athletics
Women's events at the 2000 Summer Olympics